The Amme (also known as Aame, Ame and Amedi) is a  long river mostly in Vooremaa, Estonia. It is a left tributary of the Emajõgi. Its source is Lake Kuremaa near Palamuse and it passes through the Kaiavere Lake, Elistvere Lake and drains into the Emajõgi near the site of former Kärkna Abbey.

Gallery

References

External links

Rivers of Estonia
Landforms of Jõgeva County
Landforms of Tartu County